Museo archeologico Francesco Savini (Italian for Archaeology Museum Francesco Savini)  is an archaeology museum in Teramo, Abruzzo.

History

Collection

Notes

External links

Teramo
Museums in Abruzzo
Archaeological museums in Italy